Searching is a 2018 American screenlife mystery thriller film directed by Aneesh Chaganty in his feature debut, written by Chaganty and Sev Ohanian and produced by Timur Bekmambetov. Set entirely on computer screens and smartphones, the film follows a father (John Cho) trying to find his missing 16-year-old daughter (Michelle La) with the help of a police detective (Debra Messing). This was the first mainstream Hollywood thriller headlined by an Asian-American actor.

A co-production between the United States and Russia, the film premiered at the Sundance Film Festival on January 21, 2018, and was theatrically released in the United States on August 24, 2018, by Sony Pictures Releasing. The film was a financial and critical success, grossing over $75 million worldwide against a $880,000 budget and receiving praise for its direction, acting, unique visual presentation and unpredictable storyline. At the Independent Spirit Awards, Cho was nominated for Best Male Lead.

A standalone sequel, Missing, was released on January 20, 2023.

Plot
David Kim lives in San Jose, California with his daughter Margot. His wife Pamela was diagnosed with lymphoma and died before Margot entered high school. One night Margot attempts to call David three times, but he is asleep. The next morning David cannot get in contact with Margot. Believing she has gone to her piano lesson after school, David calls the piano instructor, but he is informed that Margot cancelled her lessons six months prior. He discovers that she was pocketing the money and transferred it to a now-deleted Venmo account. He calls the police and the case is assigned to Detective Rosemary Vick. Accessing Margot's accounts, David learns that she had become a loner since Pamela's death. Vick reports that Margot made a fake ID and shows traffic camera footage of her car outside of the city, suggesting she may have run away.

David, unconvinced, discovers that Margot had been using a streaming site called YouCast and befriended a young woman called "fish_n_chips". Vick reports back that fish_n_chips is innocent, having been sighted in Pittsburgh at the time of the disappearance. From Margot's Tumblr, David finds that she frequently visited Barbosa Lake, which is near the highway where she was last seen. At the lake, he finds her Pokémon keychain on the ground. The police locate her car underwater. Her body is not inside, but there is an envelope containing the piano lesson money. A search party is arranged, but a storm slows the process.

After an altercation David has with a boy who claimed to know where Margot is, Vick tells him he can no longer participate in the investigation. Undeterred, David visits TMZ, which displays the crime scene photographs, and notices his brother Peter's jacket. He then discovers text messages between Margot and Peter, hinting at an incestuous relationship. When he confronts Peter, the latter explains that they were only smoking marijuana and confiding in each other. He further states that she was in pain after her mother's death, and chastises David for being negligent towards his daughter in her depression. Vick calls in and tells him that an ex-convict named Randy Cartoff confessed to raping and killing Margot before committing suicide.

An empty-casket funeral is arranged for Margot. As David is uploading photos to a funeral streaming site he notices that the website's stock photograph features the same woman as fish_n_chips’s profile picture. He contacts the woman and discovers that she is a stock model who does not know Margot and that the police never called her. Attempting to report this to Vick, he instead reaches a dispatcher who reveals that Vick volunteered to take the case and was not assigned to it, despite her claims. David googles Vick and finds that she knew Cartoff through a volunteer program for ex-convicts. After reporting this to the sheriff, David confronts Vick at the funeral; the police arrive and arrest Vick.

Vick agrees to confess in exchange for leniency for her son Robert. She reveals that he was using the alias fish_n_chips to get close to Margot because he had a crush on her. Margot sent the money to Robert's Venmo account thinking he was a working-class girl whose mother was in the hospital. Robert felt guilty about lying, so he wanted to return the money to Margot. When he surprised Margot by getting into her car while she was smoking, she ran, and in the scuffle, Robert accidentally pushed her off a cliff into a 50-foot-deep ravine. Vick decided to cover up the incident, pushing the car into the lake and creating the fake ID scenario. After David went to the scene of the crime and found Margot's keychain as well as her car submerged in the lake, Vick then turned Randy Cartoff into the fall guy and staged his confession and suicide.

David asks Vick where Margot's body is, and she tells him she's still in the ravine, but that even if she survived the fall, she could not have lived five days without water. David tells the police to turn around, pointing out the storm that occurred on the third day of the search that would have provided Margot with water. The rescue crew discovers Margot severely injured but alive.

Two years later, Margot has applied for college to major in piano. David tells her that Pamela would have been proud of her, something he was unable to tell her earlier. Margot is then shown changing her desktop picture from one of Pamela and her to the one David sent her of the two of them, indicating a closer relationship between the father and daughter.

Cast
 John Cho as David Kim, Margot's father
 Debra Messing as Detective Sergeant Rosemary Vick
 Michelle La as Margot Kim, the daughter of David and Pamela
 Kya Dawn Lau as 9-year-old Margot Kim
 Megan Liu as 7-year-old Margot Kim
 Alex Jayne Go as 5-year-old Margot Kim
 Sara Sohn as Pamela Nam Kim, David's wife
 Joseph Lee as Peter Kim, David's brother and Margot’s uncle
 Steven Michael Eich as Robert Vick, Rosemary's son
 Ric Sarabia as Randy Cartoff, ex-convict
 Sean O'Bryan as Radio Jockey
 Colin Woodell as 911 Operator
 Thomas Barbusca as Cody

Production
The original conception was an 8-minute short film. When Aneesh Chaganty and Sev Ohanian pitched the concept to The Bazelevs Company, the latter suggested it could be expanded into a feature film. While Ohanian was open to the offer and saw its potential, Chaganty was hesitant since he believed a feature film would be stretching the concept and feel too gimmicky. But after coming up with the intro, they felt the film would work. The character, Rosemary Vick, was named after Rosemary's Baby and The Shields character Vic Mackey. Actor John Cho turned down the role of David Kim at first because he felt that the concept of a movie seen entirely through TV, phone and computer screens was not feasible.

The film was shot on various devices. These include GoPro, drone (unmanned aerial vehicle), news helicopters, mini dv cameras, webcam, and even director Aneesh Chaganty's iPhone, which became the main camera. The scenes between Cho's David Kim and Debra Messing's Rosemary Vick were all shot in one house, with Cho on one side of the house and Messing at the other. Actress Michelle La described the filming process as a "logistical nightmare". 

It took 13 days to film, but it took about one and a half years to edit the movie.

Cho also said in an interview that the production crew made him look older in the movie by drawing lines on his face since his character had a teenage daughter.

Release
The film had its world premiere at the Sundance Film Festival on January 21, 2018. Shortly after, Sony Pictures Worldwide Acquisitions acquired distribution rights to the film for $5 million. It was initially scheduled to be released on August 3, 2018, but was pushed back to a limited release on August 24, 2018, before opening wide on August 31, 2018.

Reception

Box office
Searching grossed $26 million in the United States and Canada, and $49.4 million in other territories, for a total worldwide gross of $75.5 million.

Searching debuted to $388,769 from nine theaters in its limited opening weekend, for a per-venue average of $43,197. It expanded to 1,207 theaters on August 31, and was projected to gross $3 million over the weekend. It ended up making $6.1 million (including $7.6 million over the four-day Labor Day frame), finishing fourth at the box office. In its second weekend of wide release, the film was added to an additional 802 theaters, and grossed $4.5 million, finishing fifth. It then made another $3.2 million in its third week of wide release.

Critical response
The website's critical consensus reads, "Searchings timely premise and original execution are further bolstered by well-rounded characters brought to life by a talented cast." On Metacritic, the film has a weighted average score of 71 out of 100, based on 34 critics, indicating "generally favorable reviews". Audiences polled by CinemaScore gave the film an average grade of "A" on an A+ to F scale, while PostTrak reported filmgoers gave it a 78% overall positive score.

Varietys Peter Debruge called the film "so unique in its approach that Sundance can only program something of its kind once before the gimmick gets old." Kate Erbland of IndieWire gave the film a grade of "B+" and called it "a true storytelling feat, married with sharp editing that makes the entire effort not only seamless, but also wholly intuitive," also saying, "Aneesh Chaganty's drama transcends its gimmick, offering up a smart and refreshing spin on movies that literally play out on small screens." Screen Rants Chris Agar gave the film four out of five stars, and summed it up as "a suspenseful drama, buoyed by its innovative film making style and collection of strong performances by its leads." He added, "Even if Searching didn't make effective use of its technology angle, the core story would still work due to Chaganty's script, which packs an emotional punch from its first moments and never holds back."

Peter Travers of Rolling Stone gave the film four out of five stars and wrote "director Aneesh Chaganty, in an exceptional feature debut, does the impossible, building a high-voltage, white-knuckle thriller told almost exclusively through smartphones, laptop screens, browser windows and surveillance footage. Searching is a technical marvel with a beating heart at its core, which makes all the difference". Aisha Harris of The New York Times wrote, "While a somewhat silly reveal in the final act feels ripped from a Law & Order episode, the combination of clever concept reflecting the prevalence of screens in everyday life, and the pleasure of watching a typically underused Mr. Cho take on a meaty lead role make Searching a satisfying psychological thriller."

News18 Indias Rajeev Masand gave the film 4/5 stars and stated, "it's difficult to talk about the plot in any detail for fear of ruining the tension and its multiple twists," though "Chaganty has elevated a standard missing-person drama into something quite extraordinary on the strength of his inventive storytelling..." Mihir Fadnavis of Firstpost wrote, "this is a very exciting film that needs to be seen on the big screen and one that seems like an avenue into what the future of cinema could be...Searching has created some sort of a blueprint to make more films like this more easily at a much faster pace."

Sequel

On August 14, 2019, a sequel was announced to be in development. Chaganty clarified that the story will not "follow the same characters or plot line as the original." On January 13, 2021, it was announced that the first film's editors, Will Merrick and Nick Johnson, would write the screenplay for and direct the sequel, based on a treatment by Chaganty and Ohanian.

Accolades
 2018: Alfred P. Sloan Prize at 2018 Sundance Film Festival
 2018: NEXT Audience Award at 2018 Sundance Film Festival
 2018: Sundance Institute / Amazon Studios Narrative Producer Award to producer Sev Ohanian at 2018 Sundance Film Festival
 2019: Independent Spirit Award for Best Male Lead nomination (John Cho; lost to Ethan Hawke for First Reformed)

References

External links
 
 
 
 
 

2018 films
2010s mystery drama films
2018 thriller drama films
American mystery thriller films
American thriller drama films
Russian thriller drama films
Films about missing people
Films about mobile phones
Films about parenting
Films about the Internet
Films about social media
Films set in San Jose, California
Films about Korean Americans
Screen Gems films
Stage 6 Films films
Asian-American drama films
2018 drama films
2018 directorial debut films
2018 independent films
Alfred P. Sloan Prize winners
Mobile phone films
Found footage films
Bazelevs Company films
Screenlife films
2010s English-language films
2010s American films
English-language Russian films